What Do You Know? is a children's television program first screened on the Australian children's channel ABC3 on 27 December 2010. It is hosted by Ben Crawley

An episode of What Do You Know? was one of the lowest rating programs of the week, recording 6,000 viewers.

References

Australian Broadcasting Corporation original programming
Australian children's television series
Television shows set in Australia
2010 Australian television series debuts
2010 Australian television series endings
2010s Australian game shows